Dole, Ceredigion is a small village in the community of Tirymynach, Ceredigion, Wales. Dole is represented in the Senedd by Elin Jones (Plaid Cymru) and the Member of Parliament is Ben Lake (Plaid Cymru).
It was the home of Baron Elystan Morgan of Aberteifi until his death on 7 July 2021.

References

See also 
 List of localities in Wales by population 

Villages in Ceredigion